Mingma Gyabu Sherpa (also known as Mingma David, born 16 May 1989), is a Nepalese mountaineer and rescue climber. He was the youngest person to climb all 14 eight-thousanders, and held the Guinness World Record for "Fastest time to climb Everest and K2", which he did within 61 days.

Mountaineering career

, Sherpa was one of 43 climbers who have made successful ascents of all fourteen eight thousanders; he climbed nine of them with Nirmal Purja as a climbing sherpa in 2019.

Mingma Gyabu Sherpa was one of the 10 Nepali mountaineers that made history on 16 January 2021 as the first to ascend K2 in winter. His team consisting of Nirmal Purja, Mingma Tenzi Sherpa, Gelje Sherpa, Pem Chhiri Sherpa and Dawa Temba Sherpa, joined by the Mingma G team consisting Mingma Gyalje Sherpa (Mingma G), Dawa Tenjin Sherpa, and Kili Pemba Sherpa, and joined by Sona Sherpa from Seven Summit Treks successfully ascended the summit of K2 at 4:58 p.m. local time. After bad weather hit the lower camps at the foot of K2 and some equipment was lost, Nepali mountaineers of those three teams decided to join efforts and climb the peak together, as a team. This was the first successful K2 winter expedition after numerous attempts since 1987.

Awards
The Union of Asian Alpine Association (UAAA) has honoured Sherpa with one of the Piolet d'Or Asia Awards with the title of Sherpa of the year for his commitment to technical climbings and positive environmental stewardship in the mountains in 2019.

Eight-thousanders climbed

See also
14 Peaks: Nothing Is Impossible, 2021 film that includes Mingma Gyabu Sherpa

References

Living people
Sherpa summiters of Mount Everest
Nepalese summiters of Mount Everest
Summiters of all 14 eight-thousanders
Nepalese mountain climbers
1989 births
People from Taplejung District
Summiters of K2